The Arboretum de La Roche-Guyon (12 hectares), also known as the Arboretum de La Roche, is an arboretum managed by the Office national des forêts (ONF). It is located in the regional forest (309 hectares) north of La Roche-Guyon, Val-d'Oise, Île-de-France, France, and open daily without charge.

The arboretum was created in 1990 by the ONF. It symbolizes the geography of Île-de-France, and contains 1821 trees reflecting the region's municipalities. Each of region's départements is represented by a mass of trees: maples for the Essonne; limes and laurels for the Hauts-de-Seine; oak, dogwood, eucalyptus, blackberry, holly, and buckthorn for the Seine-et-Marne; beech for Yvelines, and so forth. Rivers are represented by strips of lawn.

See also 
 List of botanical gardens in France

References 

 Arboretum de La Roche-Guyon
 Vadelis entry (French)
 Giverny News, "L'arboretum de la Roche-Guyon", January 8, 2007 (French)
 Wikimapia entry
 Jean-Paul Labourdette, Camille Defretiere, Dominique Auzias, and Pauline Rossignol, Île-de-France, Petit Futé, 2008, page 541. .
 French Wikipedia entry :fr:Arboretum de La Roche-Guyon

Roche-Guyon, Arboretum de La
Roche-Guyon, Arboretum de La